The San Diego Seals are a lacrosse team based in San Diego, California. The team plays in the National Lacrosse League (NLL). The 2022 season is their 4th season in the NLL. The season will start on December 3, 2022. Their home opener will be on December 9, 2022 against the Saskatchewan Rush. This game will be First Responder Appreciation Night.

Brodie Merrill is continuing as team captain, and has been the captain since the Seals inaugural season. Cam Holding and Wesley Berg are the alternate captains.

The 2023 NLL Stadium Showdown, the first outdoor NLL game, was held on March 4th at Snapdragon Stadium, between the Las Vegas Desert Dogs and the San Diego Seals.

Regular season

Standings

Game log

Regular season
Reference:

The ninth game of the season will be a home game played at Snapdragon Stadium in San Diego.

Roster
References:

Entry Draft
The 2022 NLL Entry Draft took place on September 10, 2022. The Seals made the following selections:

References

San Diego
San Diego Seals seasons
San Diego Seals